This is a list of listed buildings in Lyngby-Taarbæk Municipality, Denmark.

Listed buildings

2800 Kongens Lyngby

2830 Virum

2930 Klampenborg

References

External links
 Danish Agency of Culture

 
Lyngby-Taarbæk